Hieronyma jamaicensis is a species of plant in the family Phyllanthaceae, which was recently separated from the Euphorbiaceae. It is endemic to Jamaica.  It is threatened by habitat loss.

References

Flora of Jamaica
jamaicensis
Vulnerable plants
Endemic flora of Jamaica
Taxonomy articles created by Polbot
Taxobox binomials not recognized by IUCN